Vanadium carbide is the inorganic compound with the formula VC.  It is an extremely hard refractory ceramic material.  With a hardness of 9-9.5 Mohs, it is possibly the hardest metal-carbide known. It is of interest because it is prevalent in vanadium metal and alloys.

Structure and preparation
Being isomorphous with vanadium monoxide, it crystallizes in the rock salt structure.  Because VC and VO are miscible, samples of VC typically contain an impurity of the oxide.  It is produced by heating vanadium oxides with carbon at around 1000 °C.  Vanadium carbide can be formed in the (111) orientation, when formed by radio frequency magnetron sputtering.  Although VC is thermodynamically stable, it converts to V2C at higher temperatures.

Vanadium carbide is used as an additive to cemented carbide, to refine the carbide crystals and thereby get an increased hardness of the inserts.

Physical properties
Vanadium Carbide has an elastic modulus of approximately 380 GPa.

References

Carbides
Vanadium(IV) compounds
Superhard materials
Refractory materials
Rock salt crystal structure